The Dembi is a river of southwestern Ethiopia.

See also
 List of rivers of Ethiopia

Rivers of Ethiopia